The Battle of Mekelle, sometimes known as the siege of Mekelle, took place in January 1896 during the First Italo-Ethiopian War. Italian forces surrendered a partially completed fort at Mekelle, a city in the northern Tigray Region of Ethiopia which they had occupied since 1895, to Ethiopian forces.

History 
The Italians numbered 20 officers, 13 non-commissioned officers, and 150 privates, they were supported by 1,000 Askari and two mountain guns. The Ethiopian army numbered around 27,000 men. 

Ras Makonnen laid siege to the fort, and on the morning of 7 January 1896, the defenders of the fort spotted a huge red tent among the besiegers, showing that the emperor had arrived. On 8 January 1896, the emperor's elite Shoan infantry captured the fort's well, and then beat off desperate Italian attempts to retake the well. On 19 January 1896, the fort's commander, Major Galliano, whose men were dying of dehydration, raised the white flag of surrender. Major Galliano and his men were allowed to march out, surrender their arms and to go free. Menelik stated he allowed the Italians to go free as "to give proof of my Christian faith," saying his quarrel was with the Italian government of Prime Minister Francesco Crispi that was trying to conquer his nation, not the ordinary Italian soldiers who been conscripted against their will to fight in the war. Menelik's magnanimity to the defenders of Fort Mekele may have been an act of psychological warfare. Menelik knew from talking to French and Russian diplomats that the war and Crispi himself were unpopular in Italy, and one of the main points of Crispi's propaganda were allegations of atrocities against Italian POWs. From Menelik's viewpoint allowing the Italian POWs to go free and unharmed was the best way of rebutting this propaganda and undermining public support for Crispi.

References

Footnotes

Citations

Mek'ele
Mek'ele
1896 in Ethiopia
Mek'ele
Mek'ele
History of Eritrea
History of Ethiopia
January 1896 events
Mekelle